The Times-Tribune is a six-day (Monday through Saturday) morning daily newspaper based in Corbin, Kentucky, and covering Knox, Laurel and Whitley counties in that state. It is owned by CNHI.
Founded June 17, 1882, as the weekly Corbin Enterprise, the newspaper took on the names Corbin Daily Tribune and Sunday Times when it began daily publication. Held by a succession of local owners for 100 years—Dan T. Chestnut, T.L. Metcalfe, the Price family, Fred Novels and John L. Crawford—the newspaper was sold to the Thomson Corporation in 1982 by James Crawford and J. Springer Robinson, who had owned it since 1930. American Publishing (later Hollinger International) bought it from Thomson in 1994, dealing it to the current owner, CNHI, in 1999. 
The newsroom staff are listed — Editor Erin Cox; Sports Reporter Les Dixon; Nighttime editor Brad Hall; Reporters Jarrod Mills and Emily Adams-Bentley.

See also 
 News Journal: weekly newspaper also based in Corbin

References

External links
The Times-Tribune Website
CNHI Website

Newspapers published in Kentucky
Knox County, Kentucky
Whitley County, Kentucky
Corbin, Kentucky
Laurel County, Kentucky
1882 establishments in Kentucky
Newspapers established in the 1880s